Dungiven Castle, in Dungiven, County Londonderry, Northern Ireland, is the historic seat of the Anglo-Irish Ogilby family dating back to the 17th century, although most of the current building dates from the 1830s.

Following a mixed history, which saw it hosting housing the US Army during World War II, and later being used as a dance hall during the 1950s and 1960s, the castle fell into such a state of disrepair that the local council decided to demolish it. A local pressure group fought these plans and in 1989 Glenshane Community Development bought the lease, planning to redevelop the property. Funding was sought and provided by various bodies, including the Heritage Lottery Fund, Limavady Borough Council and the International Fund for Ireland.

In March 2001 Dungiven Castle was re-opened to provide budget accommodation.
In 2009 Dungiven Castle underwent a complete redevelopment and redecoration of the entire property.

It now houses the second Irish-language-medium secondary school in Northern Ireland, Gaelcholáiste Doire.

References

External links 

Official site

Castles in County Londonderry
Grade B1 listed buildings
Dungiven